XHVJS-FM is a radio station on 103.3 FM in Ciudad Obregón, Sonora. It is owned by Radio Grupo García de León and carries the La Mejor grupera format from MVS Radio.

History
XHVJS received its concession on August 16, 1994.

References

Radio stations in Sonora